Edith Taliaferro (December 21, 1894 – March 2, 1958) was an American stage and film actress of the late 19th and early 20th centuries. She was active on the stage until 1935 and had roles in three silent films. She is best known for portraying the role of Rebecca in the 1910 stage production of Rebecca of Sunnybrook Farm.

Early life and family
Taliaferro was born in Richmond, Virginia, the daughter of theatre workers.  She was the younger sister of Mabel Taliaferro who also became a stage actress, and the cousin of actress Bessie Barriscale. Her ancestors were originally from England, of remote Italian descent (from the 1500s). They were one of the families who settled in Virginia in the 17th century.

Career

Early years

Taliaferro made her acting debut at the age of two in the stock stage production of Shore Acres, with James A. Herne. It was rumored that she obtained the part because her sister Mabel was too old to depict the character. Her New York City debut came in 1896 at Miner's Theatre on Fifth Avenue in the same play. The Harlem Opera House presented Shore Acres in October 1897.

At the age of ten, in 1904, Taliaferro was paid $100 per week by George Tyler of Liebler & Company. She signed a contract for the following season to appear with Ezra Kendall. She was the youngest Shakesperean actress on the stage. She portrayed Puck in a Ben Greet production of A Midsummer Night's Dream before an audience at Princeton University in May 1904. She was lauded by professors there, and they sent her a Princeton University flag and pin. By then, she had performed in six to eight juvenile roles after her professional debut. When she returned to New York, Taliaferro appeared with Clara Bloodgood in The Girl with the Green Eyes. Early in her career, she toured with such stars as Olga Nethersole and E.H. Sothern.

In 1907, Frederic Thompson produced Polly of the Circus, written by Margaret Mayo, for his new wife Mabel Taliaferro, and at times during its run, Edith took on the lead role of the youthful circus rider in her sister's place. It ran for more than a year at the Liberty Theater, 242 West 42nd Street. The production moved to the Wieting Theater in Syracuse, New York in November 1908.

She is most noted for her 1910 performance in Rebecca of Sunnybrook Farm. It was staged at the Republic Theater (New Victory Theater), 209 West 42nd Street. Her other successful theatrical performances include roles in Young Wisdom (1914), Tipping The Winner (1914), A Breath of Old Virginia (1915), Mother Carey's Chickens (1917), and The Bestsellers (1918).

Films, later career and retirement

Taliaferro made her silent film debut in Young Romance in 1915. She made only two more films, The Conquest of Canaan (1916) and Who's Your Brother? (1919). She returned to Broadway in 1919 in Please Get Married followed by roles in Kissing Time (1920), A Love Scandal (1923), and as "Amanda Prynne" in the touring company production of Private Lives in 1931. She performed in London, England and in Australia with the Toronto Theatre Guild. In vaudeville she appeared at the Palace Theater in New York City. Most of her later work was with summer theaters and on radio. Taliaferro retired from stage work in the late 1930s after she lost her vision.

Personal life
Taliaferro's first husband was actor Earl Browne.  The marriage was announced in July 1913.  Taliaferro's second husband was actor House B. Jameson, whom she married around 1928. Jameson appeared in various stage productions and later became known for his role as Sam "Papa" Aldrich on the radio and television series The Aldrich Family. The couple had no children and remained married until Taliaferro's death.

Death
On March 2, 1958, Edith Taliaferro died at age 63 from undisclosed causes at her home in Newtown, Connecticut.

Stage credits

Filmography

References

Footnotes

External links

 
 
 

1894 births
1958 deaths
19th-century American actresses
20th-century American actresses
American child actresses
American musical theatre actresses
American people of Italian descent
American people of English descent
American silent film actresses
American stage actresses
American radio actresses
Actresses from Richmond, Virginia
Edith
Vaudeville performers